The 2009 Giro d'Italia was the 92nd edition of Giro d'Italia, one of cycling's Grand Tours, and marked 100 years since the first race in 1909. The centenary Giro featured 198 riders from 30 countries on 22 cycling teams, starting in Venice on 9 May and finishing in Rome on 31 May.

Among the 22 teams who took part in the Giro, 15 were ProTour teams, and seven were Professional Continental teams. , on the other hand, were declined an invitation at first, but on 23 April, they were invited as the Giro's 22nd and final team. Each of the 22 teams invited to the race entered a squad of nine riders.

Twenty-nine riders abandoned the three-week race before reaching Rome. Denis Menchov of the  team won the race; after taking the lead in a long individual time trial in stage 12, he did not let his closest challenger and second-place finisher Danilo Di Luca of  escape during the mountain stages of the last week. It was announced on 22 July that Di Luca's A-sample tested positive for the erythropoietin (EPO) derivative, continuous erythropoietin receptor activator (CERA), on 20 May and 28 May. Di Luca also won the points classification, but because his B-sample confirmed the initial doping results, it is highly unlikely that he will keep the jersey and his second place in the general classification.



Teams

Cyclists

See also

References

External links 

cyclingnews.com

2009 Giro d'Italia
2009